BBC Local Radio (also referred to as Local BBC Radio) is the BBC's local and regional radio division for England and the Channel Islands, consisting of forty stations.

History

The popularity of pirate radio was to challenge a change within the at the time very "stiff" and blinkered management at the BBC. The most prominent concession by the BBC was the creation of BBC Radio 1 to satisfy the ever-demanding new youth culture with their thirst for new, popular music. The other, however, was the fact that these pirate radio stations were, in some cases, local. As a result, BBC Local Radio began as an experiment.

Initially, stations had to be co-funded by the BBC and local authorities, which only some Labour-controlled areas proved willing to do. Radio Leicester was the first to launch on 8 November 1967, followed by Leeds, Stoke, Durham, Sheffield, Merseyside, Brighton, and Nottingham. By the early 1970s, the local authority funding requirement was dropped, and stations spread across the country; many city-based stations later expand their remit to cover an entire county.

There were eight stations in the initial "experiment", which lasted for two years. When this ended, it was deemed so successful that all of the stations, except BBC Radio Durham, remained on air. In addition to this, more followed in 1970 and 1971; BBC Radio Birmingham, Bristol, Blackburn, Derby, Humberside, London, Manchester, Medway, Newcastle (replacing Radio Durham), Oxford, Solent, and Teesside.

Despite the success of this, the original stations were seen as flawed, as they originally only broadcast on the FM waveband, and not on the more widely available AM waveband. This was eventually rectified a few years after the creation of these new channels.

From 1973, Independent Local Radio (ILR) launched nationally; with nineteen stations, and more to follow in subsequent years. As a result, many of the BBC Local Radio stations found themselves in direct competition with commercial competitors, who utilised many of the popular DJs from the pirate radio stations, and who gained in most cases, large audiences. Despite this, BBC Local Radio continued to flourish, with the current network in place by the early 1990s. The network has remained in its current state since.

Current operation
The radio stations are operated from locations around the country that usually share with the BBC regional TV news services, and their news gathering bureaux. The stations are operated by the region in which the station is based and are the responsibility of the BBC English Regions department, a division of BBC News.

The remit for each Local Radio station is the same: to offer a primarily speech-based service; comprising news and information complemented by music. The target audience of BBC Local Radio are listeners aged over fifty, who are not served as well as other age groups on the BBC.

Each station produces most of their own programmes, however, some off-peak programming is produced from one station and covers all stations in the region, some are simulcast with other neighbouring regions, and most stations simulcast BBC Radio 5 Live overnight following closedown.

Since July 2020 all local BBC radio stations broadcast the networked early breakfast show presented by Jason Rosam (Monday to Friday) and Claira Hermit (Weekends) from BBC Radio London between 5am and 6am.

Transmission
All of the BBC Local Radio stations broadcast on FM, Digital radio, Freeview and BBC Sounds in their respective areas across England, but BBC Radio London is also available on Freesat and Virgin Media. 

Also, until the start of the 1990s, all BBC stations used to broadcast on MW. Initially, new stations were only launched on FM but in 1992 and 1993, six MW transmitters - BBC Radio Cleveland, BBC Radio Northampton, BBC Radio Oxford, BBC GLR, BBC GMR and one of BBC Radio Nottingham and BBC WM's transmitters - were switched off. Three are subsequently used by new commercial stations. In 1996, the MW frequencies of Radio Leicester and BBC WM were handed over to the BBC Asian Network. 

MW transmitter closures began again in 2012, initially as a five-week trial to find out if listeners would miss or complain about the lack of AM services. Two of the four transmitters partaking in the trial - BBC Radio Nottingham's MW transmitter and Radio Kent's relay at Rusthall near Tunbridge Wells - remained off-air after the BBC says that the trial switch-off attracted very few complaints from listeners. In 2018, the MW transmissions of BBC Radios Sussex, Surrey, Humberside, Wiltshire, Nottingham, Kent and Lincolnshire ended and MW coverage for BBC Devon, Lancashire and Essex was reduced. Altogether, thirteen MW transmitters were switched off. 2020 saw the end of MW transmissions of Radios Cornwall, Newcastle, Merseyside, Solent, Solent for Dorset, BBC Three Counties Radio and BBC Radio York. Also BBC Radio Cumbria stopped broadcasting on MW in Whitehaven and BBC Radio Norfolk's Norwich MW transmitter went silent  and in spring 2021, a further eight BBC Local Radio stations - BBC Essex, BBC Radio Cambridgeshire, BBC Radio Devon, BBC Radio Leeds, BBC Radio Sheffield, BBC Hereford & Worcester, BBC Radio Stoke and BBC Radio Lancashire. - stopped broadcasting on medium wave.

Due to broadcasting restrictions, some programmes are not available on BBC Sounds. In this instance, a looping message explaining this is broadcast.

Stations
A list of the forty local radio stations by region. In addition to these stations, BBC Radio Solent operates an opt-out service covering Dorset. There were also opt-out services covering Milton Keynes (BBC Three Counties Radio), Peterborough and the Fens (BBC Radio Cambridgeshire), Plymouth (BBC Radio Devon), and Swindon (BBC Wiltshire); but these ceased in 2012 due to cutbacks as part of the BBC's "Delivering Quality First" programme.

BBC East
BBC Essex
BBC Radio Cambridgeshire
BBC Radio Norfolk
BBC Radio Northampton
BBC Radio Suffolk
BBC Three Counties Radio

BBC East Midlands
BBC Radio Derby
BBC Radio Leicester
BBC Radio Nottingham

BBC London

BBC Radio London

BBC North East and Cumbria
BBC Radio Newcastle
BBC Radio Cumbria
BBC Radio Tees

BBC North West
BBC Radio Lancashire
BBC Radio Manchester
BBC Radio Merseyside

BBC South
BBC Radio Berkshire
BBC Radio Oxford
BBC Radio Solent

BBC South East
BBC Radio Kent
BBC Radio Surrey
BBC Radio Sussex

BBC South West
BBC Radio Cornwall
BBC Radio Devon
BBC Radio Somerset
BBC Radio Guernsey
BBC Radio Jersey

BBC West
BBC Radio Bristol
BBC Radio Gloucestershire
BBC Radio Wiltshire

BBC West Midlands
BBC Radio WM
BBC CWR
BBC Hereford & Worcester
BBC Radio Shropshire
BBC Radio Stoke

BBC Yorkshire

BBC Radio Leeds
BBC Radio Sheffield
BBC Radio York

BBC Yorkshire and Lincolnshire
BBC Radio Humberside
BBC Radio Lincolnshire

Former stations
BBC Dorset FM
BBC Radio Durham
BBC Southern Counties Radio
BBC Thames Valley FM

The stations were launched progressively; starting with BBC Radio Leicester on 8 November 1967, with the last station to launch being the short-lived BBC Dorset FM on 26 April 1993. Since then, many stations have been merged and renamed but no new stations have been created where no service previously existed, as plans to launch stations in unserved areas, most notably in Cheshire, have not materialised.

Imaging
Between October 2009 and April 2012, a three note jingle package produced by Mcasso Music Production was gradually rolled out across the network, and was in use by all BBC Local Radio stations. Mcasso also updated the imaging in October 2015 which was launched by BBC Radio London (on the day of the station's 45th anniversary) replacing the three-note package with a six-note package.

In January 2020, BBC Radio Leicester launched a brand new custom-made jingle package by Reelworld, based in Media City UK, Salford. The new jingle package was rolled out to all BBC Local Radio stations over the course of the year, alongside a refreshed "on air" sound to help encourage younger listeners to the station. The new station branding also incorporates a new tag line, "The Sound of *area of coverage*, and all the music you love". The new jingle package marked the first time in ten years that "sung jingles" were used in the stations' on air branding.

Dave and Sue
Dave and Sue are two fictional radio listeners created as marketing personas. Descriptions of the characters, created by the BBC, were given to all their local radio presenters as representative target listeners during the 2000s. They were later superseded by the "BBC Local Radio 2010" strategy.

The characters were created as part of "Project Bullseye". Its stated aim was "To develop great radio programming ... we need to know where the centre of our audience target is and be able to focus on it in all we do."

Dave and Sue are both 55. Sue is a school secretary, while Dave is a self-employed plumber. They are both divorcees with grown-up children. The characters shop at Asda, and wear casual clothes. The couple have little interest in high culture, or politics, and see the world as "a dangerous and depressing place". They hope that radio will be "something that will cheer them up and make them laugh".

BBC Local Radio staff were given facts and timelines about Dave and Sue, described as "composite listeners". Staff were asked to focus on producing something to which the pair would enjoy listening to.

The BBC also produced photographs of the couple, to encourage presenters to visualise their potential listeners. At the 2005 Frank Gillard Awards for BBC Local Radio, the corporation hired two actors to represent the fictional couple and award a prize to the "Receptionist of the Year".

Mia Costello of BBC Radio Solent wrote a controversial internal memo in October 2006, re-stating the importance of these characters. She wrote: "Whatever job you do on station, make sure this week, you broadcast to Dave and Sue – people in their fifties. Only put on callers sounding in the 45–64 range. I don't want to hear really elderly voices. Only talk about things that are positive and appealing to people in this age range. Only do caller round ups about people in this age range." This was reprinted the following month in the Southern Daily Echo, following which a BBC spokesperson commented "Out of context these notes sound harsh and we apologise if they offend anyone."

BBC Sounds

BBC Local Radio is available as a listen-again service on BBC Sounds.

England Unwrapped was launched in 2019 and shares stories made by Local Radio teams.

Podcasts

 A full list of Local Radio podcasts

See also

Independent Local Radio
BBC Radio
BBC English Regions
BBC Scotland
BBC Cymru Wales
BBC Northern Ireland
Radio in the United Kingdom

References

External links

BBC Local Radio
BBC Radio
Local Radio